A peerage is a legal system comprising hereditary titles in various European countries.

Peerage may also refer to:

Publications 
 Burke's Peerage, publishes guides to the royal and titled families of the United Kingdom and many other countries
Debrett's Peerage and Baronetage includes a short history of the family of each titleholder edited by Charles Kidd
 The Complete Peerage, a comprehensive and magisterial work on the titled aristocracy of the United Kingdom of Great Britain and Ireland and, later, the United Kingdom and Ireland
 The Pixilated Peeress, a 1991 fantasy novel written by L. Sprague de Camp and Catherine Crook de Camp 
 The Scots Peerage, compiled and edited by James Balfour Paul

Other uses
 Peerage Act 1963, allowing women peers and Scottish hereditary peers to sit in the House of Lords, and newly inherited hereditary peerages to be "disclaimed"

See also 
 Peer (disambiguation)